The American Trading Company of Borneo was a chartered company formed by Joseph William Torrey, Thomas Bradley Harris together with several Chinese investors shortly after the acquisition over a parcel of land in northern Borneo from the Sultanate of Brunei. The first American settlement in the area soon was named "Ellena", although it was abandoned later due to financial difficulties, diseases and riots among the workers.

History 
In 1850, the United States and Brunei signed a commercial treaty, which was activated in 1865. Out of this agreement, C.L. Moses, the then US First Consul to the sultanate, was able to secure a lease of a large territorial concession in North Borneo. The grant was made in an effort by the Sultan, who still had to address internal power struggle, to solve the problems of rebellion and piracy in North Borneo. Moses concessions were immediately sold to Torrey, a Hong Kong merchant. Together with his associates, Torrey founded American Trading Company in their attempt to develop plantation agriculture at Kimanis in 1865. This group then sold the lease to Austria's consul in Hong Kong.

References

External links 
 

American companies established in 1865
American companies disestablished in 1881
Defunct companies of the United States
Chartered companies
Trading companies of the United States
Trading companies disestablished in the 19th century
Trading companies established in the 19th century